Thomas Solberg (born 25 January 1970) is a Norwegian former football defender. Solberg began his career at Ekholt before joining Moss, the first of two spells with the club. In 1994, Solberg moved to Viking, where he stayed for over five years before an August 1999 move to Scottish side Aberdeen. He helped Aberdeen reach the 2000 Scottish League Cup Final, but was sent off in the game as they lost to Celtic. Solberg announced in October 2001 that he would return to Moss in the summer at the end of his contract, citing "homesickness" as the reason. In fact, Solberg returned slightly ahead of schedule, returning to Moss in March.

References

 

1970 births
Living people
Norwegian footballers
Norwegian expatriate footballers
Moss FK players
Viking FK players
Aberdeen F.C. players
Eliteserien players
Scottish Premier League players
Expatriate footballers in Scotland
Norwegian expatriate sportspeople in Scotland
People from Moss, Norway
Association football defenders
Sportspeople from Viken (county)